Dilochia is a genus of flowering plants from the orchid family, Orchidaceae. It contains 8 known species, native to Southeast Asia and New Guinea.

Dilochia beamanii Ormerod - Borneo(Sabah)
Dilochia cantleyi (Hook.f.) Ridl. - Indonesia, New Guinea
Dilochia carnosa  Sulist. - Indonesia(Sumat(e)ra)
Dilochia celebica (Schltr.) Schltr. - Sulawesi
Dilochia deleoniae Tandang & Galindon - Philippines
Dilochia elmeri Ames - Philippines
Dilochia longilabris J.J.Sm. - Sulawesi, Borneo
Dilochia parviflora J.J.Sm. - Borneo
Dilochia rigida (Ridl.) J.J.Wood  - Sabah
Dilochia subsessilis (Rolfe) S.Thomas - Myanmar
Dilochia wallichii Lindl. - Thailand, Malaysia, Indonesia, New Guinea, Philippines

See also 
 List of Orchidaceae genera

References 

 Pridgeon, A.M., Cribb, P.J., Chase, M.A. & Rasmussen, F. eds. (1999). Genera Orchidacearum 1. Oxford Univ. Press.
 Pridgeon, A.M., Cribb, P.J., Chase, M.A. & Rasmussen, F. eds. (2001). Genera Orchidacearum 2. Oxford Univ. Press.
 Pridgeon, A.M., Cribb, P.J., Chase, M.A. & Rasmussen, F. eds. (2003). Genera Orchidacearum 3. Oxford Univ. Press
 Berg Pana, H. 2005. Handbuch der Orchideen-Namen. Dictionary of Orchid Names. Dizionario dei nomi delle orchidee. Ulmer, Stuttgart

External links 

Arethuseae genera
Coelogyninae